Cellar Dweller is a 1988 American monster horror film about a comic book artist who unleashes a demon after drawing it. It was directed by John Carl Buechler, written by Don Mancini (credited as Kit Du Bois), and stars Debrah Farentino and Brian Robbins.

Plot
Colin Childress (Jeffrey Combs), a highly successful comic book artist who gains inspiration from a mystical book of horrific drawings, inadvertently summons an evil spirit into his basement studio. Decades later, his house has become a small art institute run by the stern Mrs. Briggs (Yvonne De Carlo). One night, comely student Whitney Taylor (Debrah Farentino) goes rooting around the sealed boxes in the cellar and releases the supernatural forces trapped there.

Cast
Debrah Farentino as Whitney Taylor (credited as Debrah Mullowney) 
Brian Robbins as Phillip Lemley 
Vince Edwards as Norman Meshelski 
Cheryl-Ann Wilson as Lisa 
Jeffrey Combs as Colin Childress 
Pamela Bellwood as Amanda 
Yvonne De Carlo as Mrs. Briggs

Release
Cellar Dweller was released directly to VHS videocassette and LaserDisc on September 20, 1988, by New World Video. In 1991, Starmaker Entertainment released a VHS tape in EP mode. MGM released an Amazon.com Exclusive VHS on September 29, 2006.

On October 29, 2013, the movie was released on DVD by Scream Factory as part of the second volume of its All-Night Horror Marathon series, along with Contamination .7, Catacombs, and The Dungeonmaster. Scream Factory released Cellar Dweller as a Blu-ray double feature with Catacombs on July 14, 2015.

Reception

Anthony Arrigo from Dread Central gave the film 3 stars out of 5, writing, "Cellar Dweller might not be quite up to the level some of Empire's celebrated cult classics have attained, but with equivocal production design and a few familiar faces – not to mention great FX work – it’s another unique picture worth watching." TV Guide was more negative, giving the film 1 of 5 stars, and opining, "An enjoyable although not particularly distinguished effort, Cellar Dweller has a number of small worthwhile moments. Director Buechler gets the most out of a somewhat limited script, pacing the action nicely, and the special effects are adequate – but, like everything else in this film, small and limited in scale."

References

External links
 
 
 

1988 films
1988 horror films
1980s monster movies
American monster movies
Empire International Pictures films
Films about comics
Films about fictional painters
Films directed by John Carl Buechler
1980s English-language films
1980s American films